Lawrence Scanlan (September 28, 1843 – May 10, 1915) was an Irish-born American prelate of the Catholic Church. A missionary and pioneer bishop, he served as the first Bishop of Salt Lake from 1891 until his death in 1915.

Early life
Scanlan was born on September 28, 1843 in Ballytarsna, County Tipperary, near Cashel, to Patrick and Catherine (née Ryan) Scanlan. He received his early education at a private school in Cashel conducted by a Mr. Delahunt and at St. Patrick's College in Thurles.

In 1863, Scanlan entered All Hallows College in Dublin, which had been founded 20 years earlier to train missionaries for English-speaking countries. He studied for the Archdiocese of San Francisco, possibly inspired by the example of Eugene O'Connell, an All Hallows professor who had been recruited by Archbishop Joseph Sadoc Alemany in 1850 and made Vicar Apostolic of Marysville in 1860.

Priesthood
While in Dublin, Scanlan was ordained to the priesthood on June 28, 1868 by Bishop John Francis Whelan, a Carmelite missionary and the Vicar Apostolic of Bombay. Following his ordination, the young priest returned home and celebrated his first Mass at the parish church in Moyne. He departed Ireland in July 1868, eventually arriving at San Francisco in November.

Scanlan's first assignment was as an assistant pastor at St. Patrick's Church (1868-70), first at the original structure on Market Street and then at the new church on Mission Street. He served for a few months at St. Mary's Cathedral before being loaned to his countryman Bishop Eugene O'Connell and given his own parish, Holy Rosary Church in Woodland.

Following the opening of silver mines in Pioche, Nevada, a petition for a Catholic priest was sent to Bishop O'Connell and he appointed Scanlan as pastor there in 1871. During his two years in Pioche, he built a church (naming it St. Laurence) as well as a hospital where the miners could receive medical attention. In early 1873, he briefly returned to California to serve as pastor of St. Vincent's Church in Petaluma, where one of his parishioners was the grandfather of Scanlan's future successor William Weigand.

Scanlan remained at Petaluma until the summer of 1873, when Archbishop Alemany appointed him to missionary work in the Utah Territory, which had been entrusted to the Archdiocese of San Francisco two years earlier. He arrived at Salt Lake City in August 1873, marking the beginning of his 42-year career in Utah. He found himself in charge of the largest parish in the United States, covering nearly 85,000 square miles and including only one church to serve a total of 800 Catholics.

Under Scanlan, the Catholic Church in Utah began to take root. He worked as a circuit rider, visiting the Catholics scattered throughout the territory and establishing churches where he went. In 1875, he invited the Sisters of the Holy Cross to Utah, where they founded St. Mary's Academy and Holy Cross Hospital in Salt Lake City the same year they arrived. In 1878, Scanlan was named vicar forane by Archbishop Alemany, making him the superior of all Catholic priests in Utah (six at that time).

In September 1886, Scanlan opened All Hallows College (named after his alma mater in Ireland) at Salt Lake City, serving on the original faculty and even residing at the college from 1887 to 1889. He turned the college's management over to the Marist Fathers in 1889 and they operated All Hallows until it closed in 1918.

Relationship with Mormons
As a Catholic missionary in the stronghold of the Church of Jesus Christ of Latter-day Saints (LDS Church), Scanlan maintained a cordial relationship with the Mormon community. In 1879, he was invited by John Menzies Macfarlane to use St. George Tabernacle to celebrate Mass, which he did on May 25 that year with music sung by the tabernacle choir. In April 1885, the Deseret News praised Scanlan for refusing to sign a petition to President Grover Cleveland calling for restrictions on the LDS Church. While he opposed polygamy, Scanlan refrained from being outspoken about his opposition and told Walter McDonald that polygamy was "not a whit worse—but better, if anything" than the private lives of some of its critics.

Episcopal career
By 1886, the growth of Catholicism in Utah was sufficient enough to lead Patrick William Riordan, Alemany's successor as Archbishop of San Francisco, to request that the Vatican erect an apostolic vicariate, essentially a provisional diocese with its own bishop. With the approval of Pope Leo XIII, the  Congregation for the Propagation of the Faith established a vicariate to cover the entire territory of Utah and parts of eastern Nevada. On January 25, 1887, Scanlan was appointed Vicar Apostolic of Utah and titular bishop of Laranda. He received his episcopal consecration on the following June 29 from Archbishop Riordan, with Bishops Eugene O'Connell and Patrick Manogue serving as co-consecrators, at St. Mary's Cathedral in San Francisco.

Four years later, the vicariate was elevated to the Diocese of Salt Lake and Scanlan was named its first bishop on January 30, 1891. Having outgrown the original church at Salt Lake City, Scanlan purchased land for a cathedral in 1890. Construction began in 1900 and finished in 1909, with Cardinal James Gibbons dedicating the new Cathedral of St. Mary Magdalene on August 15 that year. The cathedral was the crowning work of Scanlan's tenure, which began with one church and 800 Catholics in 1873 and ended in 1915 with 27 priests, 24 churches, four parochial schools, two hospitals, one orphanage, one boys' college, two girls' academies, and a Catholic population of 13,000.

Later life and death
By 1912, Scanlan was suffering from rheumatism, spending an increasing amount of time at a sanitarium in Arizona, while his vicar general was nearly blind. Following a visit from New York's Cardinal John Farley to Salt Lake City in October that year, Archbishop Riordan of San Francisco received a report from Giovanni Bonzano, the U.S. Apostolic Delegate, that said the Diocese of Salt Lake had fallen into decline. Riordan asked former U.S. Senator Thomas Kearns to evaluate the situation in Utah and he reported back in March 1913: "There seems to be no head [of the diocese]."

Scanlan eventually agreed to accept an auxiliary bishop and arrangements were made for the appointment of Joseph Sarsfield Glass, a Los Angeles priest. However, Scanlan's health took a turn for the worse before Glass could be formally appointed. Scanlan died on May 10, 1915 at Holy Cross Hospital, aged 71.

References

Episcopal succession

19th-century Irish Roman Catholic priests
1843 births
1915 deaths
Roman Catholic bishops of Salt Lake City
19th-century Roman Catholic bishops in the United States
20th-century Roman Catholic bishops in the United States
People from County Tipperary
Alumni of St. Patrick's College, Thurles
Alumni of All Hallows College, Dublin
Irish emigrants to the United States (before 1923)